Faysal Bettache (born 7 July 2000) is an English professional footballer who plays as a midfielder for club St. Louis City SC 2.

Club career

Queens Park Rangers
Born in Westminster, Bettache joined Queens Park Rangers from Watford in March 2014 at the age of 13. 

During pre-season of the 2018–19 campaign, Bettache was noticed by manager Steve McClaren and become involved with first team affairs, after featuring heavily for the under-23 squad. On 28 August 2018, Bettache was named as a substitute in the second round of the 2018–19 EFL Cup against Bristol Rovers, he replaced Bright Osayi-Samuel in the 85th minute to make his first team and professional debut. On 25 May 2019, Bettache signed his first professional contract with QPR after completing his three-year scholarship with the academy.

On 15 November 2019, Bettache joined Billericay Town on a one-month loan. The deal was later extended until 25 January 2020.

Towards the end of the 2019–20 season, Bettache made his Championship debut against Charlton Athletic and made two further contributions before the end of the season.

On 28 October 2020, Bettache signed a new three-year contract until 2023 with an option for a further year.

Bettache joined EFL League Two club Oldham Athletic on a season-long loan on 20 August 2021. On 10 December 2021, it was announced that Bettache would be recalled by QPR when the transfer window reopened in January, having made 13 appearances in all competitions at Oldham.

On 13 September 2022, Bettache signed for National League club Aldershot Town on a three-month loan deal.

On 20 January 2023, he was released on a mutual termination of his contract

Personal life
Born in England, Bettache is of Algerian descent.

Career statistics

References

2000 births
Living people
English footballers
English people of Algerian descent
Association football midfielders
Footballers from Westminster
Queens Park Rangers F.C. players
Billericay Town F.C. players
Oldham Athletic A.F.C. players
Aldershot Town F.C. players
National League (English football) players
English Football League players
MLS Next Pro players